Pablo Albano and Cyril Suk were the defending champions but they competed with different partners that year, Albano with Lucas Arnold and Suk with Marius Barnard.

Albano and Arnold lost in the second round to Wolfgang Schranz and Thomas Strengberger.

Barnard and Suk lost in the semifinals to Àlex Corretja and Luis Lobo.

Corretja and Lobo won in the final 6–1, 6–4 against Simon Aspelin and Andrew Kratzmann.

Seeds
Champion seeds are indicated in bold text while text in italics indicates the round in which those seeds were eliminated. All eight seeded teams received byes to the second round.

Draw

Final

Top half

Bottom half

External links
 2001 Generali Open Doubles Draw

Austrian Open Kitzbühel
2001 ATP Tour